The Crown Colony of British North Borneo competed at the 1962 British Empire and Commonwealth Games in Perth, Western Australia, from 22 November to 1 December 1962.

Athletics

Men
Track events

Field events

Key
Note–Ranks given for track events are within the athlete's heat only
N/A = Round not applicable for the event

See also
 North Borneo at the 1956 Summer Olympics

References

1962
Nations at the 1962 British Empire and Commonwealth Games